Lyces longistria is a moth of the family Notodontidae first described by William Warren in 1904. It is found in eastern Ecuador.

Larvae have been reared on Passiflora monadelpha.

External links
Species page at Tree of Life Web Project

Notodontidae
Moths described in 1904